Underwood International College, Yonsei University was founded in 2006 as a constituent college of Yonsei University. Based in Seoul and Incheon, South Korea.

The college is the first and only liberal arts college in the Republic of Korea, and the only college at Yonsei University to conduct and assess all classes in English. It has small classes taught by approximately 100 Korean and international faculty, many who hold undergraduate and/or graduate degrees from prestigious western institutions, such as Ivy League and Oxbridge universities. For the Class of 2020, the college received 2,637 applications for 416 student places across three academic divisions — an acceptance rate of 15.78%. The number of applications and student spots have continued to rise steadily since 2015.

History
Underwood International College, Yonsei University accepted its inaugural class in March 2006. Its first dean was Professor Jongryn Mo. Earlier, in October 2004, the President of Yonsei University had appointed Mo as Chairman of the "University Committee for New International College", and Mo contributed significantly to the early development of the institution.

The college first began with just five majors: Comparative Literature and Culture, Economics, International Studies, Political Science and International Relations, and Life Science and Biotechnology. These five original majors are housed under what is now known as the Underwood Division. In 2012, Underwood International College added the Asian Studies Division as well as four new majors under the Techno-Art Division. In combination with the Integrated Social Sciences Division, which was established in 2014, these three divisions compose the comprehensive and interdisciplinary Humanities and Social Sciences (HASS) Field. Finally, 2014 also saw the introduction of the Integrated Science & Engineering Division, which includes the following three STEM majors: Nano Science and Engineering, Energy and Environmental Science and Engineering, and Bio-Convergence.

Since its inauguration, not only has the college experienced significant growth in the size of its community, but it has also increased its number of programs offered to the students, including the annual Global Career Tour and Global Research Competition. Also, with its expansion to the Yonsei International Campus in Songdo, UIC focused on bolstering its educational infrastructure, establishing the UIC Veritas Research Center, UIC Writing Center, UIC MSR Center, and Design Factory Korea (in collaboration with Aalto University in Finland).

Degree Programs

Majors
Underwood International College currently offers 16 majors across three different divisions of study.

Minors
 Korean Studies
 Certificate in Creative Writing

Graduate degree
 M.S. in Innovation (Launched in Fall 2020)

Academic Partnerships and Exchange Programs 

UIC maintains collegial ties with Dartmouth College in Hanover, New Hampshire. As of 2013, it has signed exchange partnerships with institutions such as Barnard College (Columbia University), Waseda University, University of California, Berkeley Department of Economics, University of Geneva, and University College Utrecht.

One of UIC's first exchange programs was the "Three-Campus Comparative East Asian Program." It commenced in 2008 in collaboration with University of Hong Kong and Keio University in Japan. The program allows UIC students to take a year of study across the three campuses. Another example of a program only offered to UIC students is hosted at Amherst College in Amherst, Massachusetts. The two schools signed a MoU partnership agreement in 2019 to host a semester-based bilateral exchange program.

On top of these UIC-exclusive programs, UIC students also have the opportunity to participate in Yonsei-wide study abroad programs offered by the Office of International Affairs.

Career Development Center 
Underwood International College, Yonsei University's Career Development Center (CDC) provides students with services and resources to guide and prepare themselves for successful careers. It regularly posts a list of job and internship opportunities, and sponsors career-related workshops for students every academic semester. It also works with the Global Career Society, an internal group within the CDC, and the UIC dormitory houses in the Residential College program to host events for students.

Global Career Tour 
Since 2008, Underwood International College has organized subsidized overseas trips to provide students with opportunities to visit international organizations and corporations to gain exposure to the working environment. During these trips, students have the opportunity to meet with industry professionals, who often share their career pathways and experiences, as well as tips about the recruitment process. Past trips have involved travel to major business districts in Tokyo, Hong Kong, London, New York, San Francisco, and Singapore. In 2020, due to the COVID-19 pandemic, the Global Career Tour was held online, with participating professionals from Amazon, Standard and Poor’s (Hong Kong), British American Tobacco (Indonesia), Google (Korea), Procter & Gamble (Korea), and SoftBank (Japan).

Controversies

Faculty retention 
The UIC faculty body is mostly young and untenured having a little power in decision making while the central administration dictates it. A UIC faculty member comments, “At times, it seems [there is] an utter lack of transparency. Well, it certainly decreases job satisfaction for faculty members.”  Some faculty members reported that there is a “glass ceiling” for their career prospects. UIC faculty member John M. Frankl, however, refuted assertions that UIC faculty members leave after a few years in proportions that are higher than peer institutions.

Expansion to Yonsei International Campus 
In 2011, the main base of UIC was moved from Seoul to Incheon despite the opposition from students and the faculty. According to a Korea Times article, most students opposed the school’s decision to move the campus. Before his death in 2008, Horace Underwood, a professor emeritus at Yonsei University, stated that moving UIC to Songdo International Business District will "destroy" it. However, students who have experienced residential college life at Songdo campus have been satisfied with their experience and rate the academic environment at Songdo Global Campus quite highly, although they do mention that maintaining relationships with people from other grades, who may be at the Sinchon campus, are challenging.

Quality of education 
In the Fall 2017 semester, UIC's student newsletter Scribe released an article discussing student dissatisfaction with the academic curriculum. A post on the College of Economics and Commerce Student Council's Facebook page announced that the department would eliminate five major courses. Of the five closed courses, four were taught in English and offered as major electives to UIC students. Because priority registration was given to the non-UIC Economics students, many UIC students were left questioning the accessibility to major courses. Secondly, the Scribe article observed the lack of full-time faculty as well as the English skills of certain lecturers, two factors that have led to the criticism that UIC is a "a stilted, substandard version of the intellectually engaging and challenging academic scene the college promotes." Thirdly, UIC's expensive tuition, in comparison to other Korean universities, has made many students "feel they pay double tuition for only a half's-education."

Representation in the student body 
According to a 2017 Yonsei Annals article titled "Underwood International College (UIC)'s Identity Crisis," underrepresentation of international students has been a problem since the college was founded in 2006. The students believed that the problem was exacerbated by the lack of an international student representative in the official UIC Student Congress.  This highlighted the irony that UIC was advertised as a global learning environment despite the dissatisfaction felt by the members of its international community. However, taking this feedback into account, each UIC Student Congress since 2017 has included at least two international student representatives. Also, SAM, the official UIC Student Ambassadors, is composed mostly of international students.

Bibliography

References

External links
 Official Website

Yonsei University
Educational institutions established in 2006
2006 establishments in South Korea